Caiza "D" Municipality is the second municipal section of the José María Linares Province in the Potosí Department in Bolivia.

References 

Municipalities of Potosí Department